Caittil Find was the leader of a contingent of Norse-Gaels, recorded as being defeated in battle in 857 CE. Some historians have considered him to be identical to Ketill Flatnose, a prominent Norse sea-king who had strong associations with the Hebrides of Scotland and Olaf the White.  This view is however not shared by all.

The Annals of Ulster record that in 857 Caittil Find was defeated in battle in Munster, Ireland.

The name "" may be a Gaelicisation of the  Old Norse "".  was a popular name at this period and it is not clear whether the Gaelic  even represents this Norse name. 's byname means "white" (or "fair") not "flat-nosed", as Alex Woolf points out.

Nor do the Icelandic sources which document  hint at his being active in Ireland.  was the father-in-law of Olaf the White, yet  is recorded as battling  (≈Olaf the White). Other historians propose that  may have been active in Wales prior to his coming to Ireland.

References

Norse-Gaels